Morrison House was a historic home located at Harrisonburg, Virginia. It was built between 1820 and 1824, and was a two-story, brick Federal style town house with a two-story, brick rear ell.  It had a metal sheathed side-gable roof and interior end chimneys.

It was listed on the National Register of Historic Places in 1971.  The house was demolished in February 1982.

References

Former National Register of Historic Places in Virginia
Houses on the National Register of Historic Places in Virginia
Federal architecture in Virginia
Houses completed in 1824
Houses in Harrisonburg, Virginia
National Register of Historic Places in Harrisonburg, Virginia